Ninnescah Township is a township in Kingman County, Kansas, United States.  As of the 2000 census, its population was 313.

Geography
Ninnescah Township covers an area of 69.97 square miles (181.21 square kilometers); of this, 0.5 square miles (1.28 square kilometers) or 0.71 percent is water. The township surrounds the southern half of the county seat of Kingman. The streams of Hunter Creek, Negro Creek, Petyt Creek and Wild Run Creek run through this township.

Unincorporated towns
 Alameda
(This list is based on USGS data and may include former settlements.)

Adjacent townships
 White Township (north)
 Galesburg Township (northeast)
 Dale Township (east)
 Eagle Township (southeast)
 Richland Township (south)
 Belmont Township (south)
 Peters Township (southwest)
 Union Township (west)
 Eureka Township (northwest)
 Hoosier Township (north)

Major highways
 K-14 (Kansas highway)

References

 United States Census Bureau cartographic boundary files

External links
 US-Counties.com
 City-Data.com

Townships in Kingman County, Kansas
Townships in Kansas